The Sarygamysh Lake, also Sarykamysh or Sary-Kamysh, is a lake in Central Asia. It is about midway between the Caspian Sea and the Aral Sea. It is the largest lake in Turkmenistan, in which three quarters of the entire lake's area is located (a quarter of the area falls on Uzbekistan). The Sarykamysh basin and the Sarykamysh delta of the Amu Darya river are physical and geographical nature regions of the Dashoguz Region of Turkmenistan.

Up until the 17th century, the lake was fed by the Uzboy River, a distributary of the Amu Darya River, which continued on to the Caspian Sea. Today, its main source of water is a canal from the Amu Darya but also the runoff water from surrounding irrigated lands, containing high levels of pesticides, herbicides and heavy metals.

Contribution to the drying up of the Aral Sea 

Etymology 
The name of the lake comes from the Turkic words sari (yellow) and qamish (depression), a reference to the yellow color of silt and salt in the old dried up basin before its flooding by the Soviets.  The modern Turkmen authorities wish to "Turkmenize" the name by contending that the name is Turkmen sarykamysh 'yellow reed'.

The Turkmen section of the lake and the land around it is protected by the Sarygamyş Sanctuary.

History
Throughout its history, the lake has disappeared several times and re-emerged, depending on the arrival of the Amu Darya waters. The drying out periods of the Sarygamysh lake were associated with the confluence of the river into the Aral Sea. The lake existed at the end of the Neogene period, in the upper anthropocene  (at 58 m above sea level), when its area covered, including the modern Assake-Audan basin, and then in the 14th - 16th centuries AD (at the level of 50–62 metres above sea level). It was first discovered and charted by the Russian geographer, Nikolai Petrusevich, in 1876. The last time the waters of the Amu Darya directly entered the basin was during the flood of 1878.

Since the beginning of the 1960s, the Sarykamysh lake has been filled with collector-drainage waters, feeding was carried out through the Daryalyk collector, while water from the farmland of the left bank of the Amu Darya was used.

Fauna 
The ichthyofauna of Lake Sarykamysh was formed by species that penetrated from the Amu Darya and water bodies of the adventitious drainage network. For the most part, the lake is inhabited by native species of the Aral-Amu Darya basin and immigrant species, both spontaneously penetrated and purposefully transferred to the reservoir for fish breeding purposes in 1969–1974. In 1980–1987, 27 species lived here, and in 2018 there were already 32, of which 34.4% are immigrant species. In total, during the existence of the lake, 36 species of various representatives of ichthyofauna were recorded in it, including carp, catfish and snakehead. At the end of 2020, two tons of carp, silver carp and grass carp fry were released into the Sarykamysh lake in the territory of the Dashoguz velayat of Turkmenistan.

Sarygamysh lake is also inhabited by such bird species as white swans, pink and curly pelicans, cormorants.

Gallery

References

External links 
 

Lakes of Turkmenistan
Lakes of Uzbekistan
Endorheic lakes of Asia
International lakes of Asia
Turkmenistan–Uzbekistan border